The Dampier Marine Park (formerly known as the Dampier Commonwealth Marine Reserve) is an Australian marine park offshore of Western Australia, north-east of Karratha. It is one of the 13 parks managed under the North-west Marine Parks Network.

Conservation values

Species and habitat
Foraging areas adjacent to important breeding areas for migratory seabirds.
Foraging areas adjacent to important nesting sites for marine turtles.
Includes part of the migratory pathway of the protected humpback whale.
The reserve provides a high level of protection for offshore shelf habitats adjacent to the Dampier Archipelago.

Bioregions and ecology
The reserve provides high level protection for the shallow shelf with depths ranging from 15 metres to 70 metres.
Examples of the communities and seafloor habitats of the Northwest Shelf Province provincial bioregion as well as the Pilbara (nearshore) and Pilbara (offshore) meso-scale bioregions.

History
The marine park was proclaimed under the EPBC Act on 14 December 2013 and renamed Dampier Marine Park on 9 October 2017. The management plan and protection measures of the marine park came into effect for the first time on 1 July 2018.

Summary of protection zones
The Dampier Marine Park has been assigned IUCN protected area category VI. However, within the marine park there are three protection zones, each zone has an IUCN category and related rules for managing activities to ensure the protection of marine habitats and species.

The following table is a summary of the zoning rules within the Dampier Marine Park:

See also

 Protected areas managed by the Australian government

References

External links
 North-west Marine Parks Network - Parks Australia
 North-west Marine Parks Network - environment.gov.au (outdated)

Australian marine parks